Locust Lawn is a historic tobacco plantation house and national historic district located near Oxford, Granville County, North Carolina.  It was built about 1855 by Armistead Ravenscroft Burwell, a descendant of the prominent Burwell Family of Virginia and is a two-story, three bay, "T"-shaped Greek Revival style dwelling.  It has a two-story rear ell, one-story kitchen wing, brick cellar and central front porch.  Also on the property are the contributing six log tobacco barns, two frame barns, frame corncrib, overseer's house, and Burwell Family cemetery.

It was listed on the National Register of Historic Places in 1988.

References

Tobacco plantations in the United States
Plantation houses in North Carolina
Farms on the National Register of Historic Places in North Carolina
Historic districts on the National Register of Historic Places in North Carolina
Greek Revival houses in North Carolina
Houses completed in 1855
Houses in Granville County, North Carolina
National Register of Historic Places in Granville County, North Carolina